Willibald "Willi" Ruttensteiner (born 12 November 1962) is an Austrian businessman and football administrator and manager who serves as head coach of the Israel national team as well as the head of the youth development program "Project12". Following the resignation of Dietmar Constantini in September 2011, Ruttensteiner was acting trainer of the Austria national team for two games. In the two games he managed a win and a tie.

He was also responsible for the signing of national coach Marcel Koller, who was controversial in the beginning and later very successful.

Early life
Ruttensteiner was born in Steyr, Austria. He is Christian.

Career as manager
 1993 – 1995:  (Champion 1993/1994) 
 1995 – 1996: U18-trainer FC Linz (Austrian Champion) 
 1996 – 1997: Co-Trainer FC Linz (Champion under Heinz Hochhauser) 
 1997 – 1998: Head coach FC Linz
 1998 – 1999: Sports director LASK Linz and youth manager of the Upper Austrian Football Association
 1999 – 2001: ÖFB sports coordinator and U21-Trainer
 2001 – 2006: ÖFB sports director and U21-Trainer
 since 2006: ÖFB sports director
 October 2005: Responsible for training the Austria national football team in the 2006 FIFA World Cup qualification games against England and Northern Ireland
 September – November 2011: Responsible for training the Austria national football team in the European Championship qualification games against Azerbaijan and Kazakhstan.
 June 2018: Israel Football Association sports director (under Israel's head coach and Austrian manager Andi Herzog)
 July 2020: Israel head coach

Career as a player
 Union Wolfern

Managerial Statistics

References

External links
 Sportdirektor des ÖFB 
 Talentförderung Projekt 12 

Living people
1962 births
People from Steyr
Sportspeople from Upper Austria
Austrian footballers
Football people in Austria
FC Wels players
Austrian football managers
Israel national football team managers
Austria national football team managers
Austrian Christians
Association footballers not categorized by position